Kenneth Alven Brett (September 18, 1948 – November 18, 2003) was an American Major League Baseball pitcher and the second of four Brett brothers who played professional baseball, the most notable being the youngest, George Brett. Ken played for ten teams in his 14-year MLB career.

Born in Brooklyn, Brett grew up in El Segundo, a suburb of Los Angeles just south of Los Angeles International Airport.

Baseball career

1967 World Series
Just out of El Segundo High School at age 17, Brett was the fourth overall pick in the 1966 Major League Baseball Draft, selected by the Boston Red Sox as a pitcher; the nineteen other MLB teams coveted him as a sweet-swinging center fielder. Fifteen months later, he was called up to the major leagues from Single-A ball, he participated in the final week of a heated American League pennant race in September . Boston won the league title by defeating the Minnesota Twins on the final day of the season, finishing a single game ahead of both Detroit and Minnesota, and three games ahead of Chicago. Brett was not expected to be on the World Series roster to face the St. Louis Cardinals, but was added as an emergency injury replacement for Sparky Lyle, a transaction requiring the commissioner's approval.

Days later on October 8, Brett became the youngest pitcher ever in the World Series, appearing in relief in Game 4. He pitched a scoreless eighth inning, yielding a walk. In Game 7, he entered the game with the bases loaded in the top of the ninth inning and induced Tim McCarver to ground out to the first baseman to end the threat. At just 19 years and three weeks, he gave up no hits in  scoreless innings in his two appearances.

"Nothing ever fazed him. We had no hesitation about putting him on the World Series roster, none at all," recalled Dick Williams, Boston's rookie manager that year. "He had the guts of a burglar."

1968–81
Shortly after that World Series, Brett spent six months in the Army Reserve and missed spring training in 1968. In his first Triple-A outing back (for 
Louisville), he was left in for nine innings and developed arm trouble; he endured a couple of surgeries, and his career never lived up to early expectations. He would later state that the worst curse in life is unlimited potential.

Brett was traded in consecutive years, after the 1971 and 1972 seasons. The former was part of a ten-player blockbuster that sent him, George Scott, Jim Lonborg, Billy Conigliaro, Joe Lahoud, and Don Pavletich to the Milwaukee Brewers for Tommy Harper, Marty Pattin, Lew Krausse, and minor-league outfielder Pat Skrable on October 10, 1971. Then, both he and Lonborg, along with Ken Sanders and Earl Stephenson, were dealt to the Philadelphia Phillies for Don Money, John Vukovich, and Bill Champion on October 31, 1972. While with the Phillies in 1973, he gave up Hank Aaron's 700th home run on July 21 in Atlanta. "I won the game, so it didn't matter that much to me," Brett said. "Aaron gave me an autographed picture the next day, and I stood there and tore it up in mock anger. I always took the game seriously, but I also had a good time playing it."

Although a much-traveled pitcher who played for ten MLB teams over a 14-year career, Brett did have remarkable career moments. He was the winning pitcher of the All-Star Game in 1974, where he was the only member of the host team Pittsburgh Pirates on the National League squad. Earlier that year on May 27, Brett held the San Diego Padres off base with a perfect game into the ninth inning before settling for a two-hit shutout win in the first game of a Memorial Day doubleheader, in which he also had a hit and batted in a run. In the second game, he had a pinch-hit triple to spark a five-run seventh to help the Pirates sweep.

Brett was traded with Willie Randolph and Dock Ellis from the Pirates to the New York Yankees for Doc Medich on December 11, 1975. His stay was brief, traded in mid-May (with Rich Coggins) to the Chicago White Sox for Carlos May. A week later on May 26, 1976, he had a no-hitter going for the White Sox with two out in the ninth in a scoreless game at California Angels. Jerry Remy's slow roller down the third base line was allowed to roll unplayed by Jorge Orta and amid some controversy, was scored a hit rather than an error. Brett pitched ten innings and won the game 1–0, in eleven innings.

Throughout his career, Brett was best known as an outstanding hitting pitcher, perhaps the best of his era. In 347 career at bats, he recorded 91 hits (29 for extra bases), yielding a .262 batting average and slugged an impressive .406. He hit 18 doubles, 1 triple, and 10 home runs with 44 RBI. While with the Phillies in 1973, he hit a home run in four consecutive pitching starts (from June 9 to June 23). In his All-Star year of 1974 with the Pirates, he hit a remarkable .310 (27 for 87), appearing in 43 games (27 as a starting pitcher and 16 as a pinch hitter). His .310 batting average was higher than six of the eight starting position players on the Pirates in 1974, a team that won the National League Eastern division title. "I took a lot of pride in my ability to hit," he said. "In high school, I was also an outfielder and a pretty good hitter. I always thought my being able to hit helped me in games, and I pinch-hit a lot for pitchers, although there were a couple times in Pittsburgh when I hit for Kurt Bevacqua (a utility player).  He didn't like that much. I never took extra batting practice or anything like that. On days when I pitched, I'd get my swing in during batting practice." Dodgers manager Tommy Lasorda was an admirer of Brett's hitting ability and once remarked that "if we'd drafted him, we'd have put him in center field and he'd have stayed there."

This significantly limited his at-bats in the second half of his career, not only as a starting pitcher, but also as a pinch hitter. In , Brett was used as a pinch hitter twelve times for the White Sox, more than any other pitcher in the American League. In  with the California Angels, Brett transitioned to relief pitching.

In , Brett returned to the National League as a reliever with the Los Angeles Dodgers. At the end of his career, Brett and his youngest brother George were teammates on the Kansas City Royals. Ken was added to the Royals roster in August 1980, the year the Royals finally won the American League pennant and George hit .390 and was the AL MVP; the Royals fell to the Philadelphia Phillies in six games in the World Series.

Brett was released by the Royals following the 1981 season and retired from baseball shortly thereafter. He had a career record of 83–85, with an ERA of 3.93 in 349 games, with 184 starts and 51 complete games.

Brett played for ten major league teams, but in his nine team changes he was traded a mere six times, and released the last three. "I'll never forget the first time he came on in relief for the Royals," George recalled. "The bullpen was out in right field and they opened up the gate, and he came running in like an airplane -- arms spread out like wings, banking left, banking right, banking left and banking right. I'm on the mound with Jim Frey, our manager, and Jamie Quirk, who I'd played with for years and was Ken's dear friend. And I looked at Jamie and he looked at me, and I said, 'Now I know why he's been traded ten times.'"

Brett wore his frequent change of uniforms as both a badge of honor and humor. In a commercial for Miller Lite beer in 1984, he raised a glass in a salute to the town he thought he was in, only to be told he was not in that town. He spun through his mental rolodex and named every major and minor league town he could think of; the punchline – "Utica?" – led to an invitation to the city by the mayor, and then a minor league manager's job with the Utica Blue Sox.

Baseball author Bill James wrote that Brett was the best hitting pitcher of the 1970s.

Post-playing career
After a year as a minor league manager in Utica in 1985, Brett worked as a broadcaster for the Seattle Mariners in 1986, then the California Angels for the next eight years. He then coached baseball at the collegiate level, and co-owned minor league baseball and hockey teams and a sporting goods company in Spokane, his home since 1998, with his brothers John, Bobby, and George.

Brett, along with his brother, All-Stars Steve Garvey, Fred Lynn, Ellis Valentine, and Dodgers manager Tommy Lasorda made guest appearances in an episode of ABC's Fantasy Island (Season 1, Episode 8, "Superstar/Salem"). Aired in March 1978, all of the players had at least one speaking line. As an inside joke between brothers, George Brett was embarrassed twice in the episode - once by booting a routine grounder and a second time by being struck out by a non-athlete (Gary Burghoff) who was there fulfilling his fantasy. George has since said that Ken pointed out he would be the perfect "fool" for those moments.

After a six-year battle with brain cancer, which included two operations, Brett died at age 55 on November 18, 2003, in Spokane. He was the third member of the 1981 Royals team to succumb to brain cancer, following manager Dick Howser in 1987 and relief pitcher Dan Quisenberry in 1998.

References

External links

Ken Brett at SABR (Baseball BioProject)
Historic Baseball - Player profiles & obituaries - Ken Brett
Card Corner Plus: 1974 Topps: The Tragic Loss of Ken Brett
1967 World Series - Baseball-Reference.com
1967 World Series  Baseball-Almanac.com
1974 All Star Game - 23-July 1974
Box score - 26-May-1976 - White Sox @ Angels

1948 births
2003 deaths
National League All-Stars
Boston Red Sox players
California Angels players
Chicago White Sox players
Kansas City Royals players
Los Angeles Dodgers players
Louisville Colonels (minor league) players
Milwaukee Brewers players
Minnesota Twins players
New York Yankees players
Omaha Royals players
Oneonta Red Sox players
Philadelphia Phillies players
Pittsburgh Pirates players
Pittsfield Red Sox players
Winston-Salem Red Sox players
Major League Baseball pitchers
Major League Baseball broadcasters
California Angels announcers
Seattle Mariners announcers
Baseball players from New York (state)
Baseball players from Spokane, Washington
Deaths from brain cancer in the United States
El Segundo High School alumni